The Daily Independent is a daily newspaper serving Ridgecrest, California, United States. It is owned by Gannett.

The Daily Independent has been in business since 1926. This small-market daily has its main focus on hyperlocal journalism, covering the news of the Indian Wells Valley. It also has strong sports coverage, focusing on youth sports, three local high schools and a community college.

In 2013, Gannett subsidiary Gatehouse Media, which owns the Independent, was awarded a contract to print The Rocketeer 2. The Rocketeer is a small newspaper whose focus is Naval Air Weapons Station China Lake.

References

External links 
 

Daily newspapers published in California
Mass media in Kern County, California
Ridgecrest, California
Gannett publications